U-165 may refer to one of the following German submarines:

 , a Type U 93 submarine launched in 1918; served in World War I until accidentally sunk on 18 November 1918 before surrendering; raised and stricken on 21 February 1919; broken up 
 , a Type IXC submarine that served in World War II until sunk on 27 September 1942

Submarines of Germany